Marma may refer to:

 Marma people, an ethnic Arakanese group in Bangladesh
 Marma language, of Bangladesh
 Marma (spider), a genus of spiders
 Marma (film), a 2002 Indian film
 Marma, Sweden, a town in Sweden
 Marma, Dhanbad, a town in India
 Marma (Ayurveda), in Ayurveda, a pressure point on the body

Language and nationality disambiguation pages